Bovel (Gallo: Bovèu) is a commune in the Ille-et-Vilaine department in Brittany in north-France.

Population

Inhabitants of Bovel are called Bovellois in French.

See also
Communes of the Ille-et-Vilaine department

References

External links

  
Mayors of Ille-et-Vilaine Association 

Communes of Ille-et-Vilaine